'Whonnock Lake 
It is a natural muskeg lake and, if left alone, it will slowly turn into a peat marsh. The only regular water input is from the north. There is an exit to Whonnock Creek on the south-east side originally closed off by a sandbar (beaver dam) that was replaced in 2008 by a man-made berm and fish channel. This is where the water escapes from the lake to Whonnock Creek. The lake is used as a practice facility for the Ridge Canoe and Kayak Club, and has hosted many sprint kayak and canoe competitions.

References

Maple Ridge, British Columbia
Lakes of the Lower Mainland
Unincorporated settlements in British Columbia
New Westminster Land District